The IBM 3720 was a communications controller (front-end processor) made by IBM, suitable for use with IBM System/390. The 3720, introduced in 1986, was capable of supporting up to 60 communications lines, and was a smaller version of the 3725.  Official service support was withdrawn in 1999 in favour of the IBM 3745.

The IBM 3720 is unrelated to the similarly-numbered IBM 3270 display terminal system.

References

External links
IBM 3720 Communication Controller Service Guide (PDF)

3720